Planet of the Apes: Visionaries is a comic book based on the Rod Serling script for the first Planet of the Apes movie.

Plot
Astronauts John Thomas, Paul LaFever and Dodge are in deep hibernation when their spaceship automatically lands on an unknown habitable planet after a light-speed voyage. They discover their fourth crew mate, a man named Stewart, dead due to a malfunction of his pod. The three survivors set off to explore the planet on an all-terrain vehicle, traveling through a desolate wasteland, until they discover a jungle, where they find eerie scarecrow-like figures and they're forced to abandon the vehicle when it sinks into quicksand. At a beach, they come across a tribe of primitive humans, following them back into the jungle where they're attacked by a group of apes that use helicopters and jeeps.

The simian hunters shoot Dodge dead and Thomas is also injured and separated from Paul. Thomas awakens in a cell where other humans are kept and studied by chimpanzee scientists, Dr. Zira among these. Unable to speak, Thomas opens his wound and writes "I Can Speak" on the wall with his own blood, but is washed away when a gorilla guard uses a fire hose to punish an escaping human. Zira shares her fascination towards Thomas with her superior, the orangutan Dr. Zaius, who dismisses his unusual behavior as arrogant and plans to lobotomize him. Thomas makes an escape attempt by hiding in a supply truck and sees a modern Ape City, much like a city on Earth, but tailored to the simian society. He is believed to be an escaped trained human and is quickly recaptured and taken back to the lab.

Thomas manages to steal a notebook and writes messages to prove Zira his intelligence. Learning that there were others in his party, Zira phones Mr. Digby, the orang hunt leader, and takes Thomas to visit Paul, who has become incoherent and primitive after suffering a severe hit to the head. Zira presents her findings to a scientific assembly, but is met with skepticism from the apes and Zaius, who believes Thomas to be a well-trained human and orders a lobotomy. Rushing to the operating theater, Zira and Zaius witness Thomas' first words to an ape, as he is strapped to the operating table: "No! Leave. Me. ALONE." Thomas becomes a celebrity as a talking human and explains that he is from another planet called Earth and wishes to return to his planet. During his stay in the civilized Ape society, Thomas is appalled to see Dodge being turned into a stuffed museum exhibit, learns about a radioactive region and how Apes consider themselves evolved from humans. Thomas cracks this belief by befriending a primitive woman, Nova, who he teaches to stay upright, dress and even speak a few words within five weeks.

At an archaeological excavation site near the radioactive zone, Zaius joins Zira's fiancée Cornelius, the head of the expedition. Thomas arrives shortly afterwards on another helicopter having been invited by Cornelius, unbeknownst to Zaius. Cornelius shows that they have found human skeletons, before digging out a human doll that talks and discovering a shaft that leads to a room with more human skeletons laying in beds, revealing the whole thing to be a bomb shelter. Back in the Ape City, Paul (who was moved into the lab) has started to recover his senses and speaks, but is savagely beaten by two gorillas.

At the dig site, Thomas wakes to the sound of explosions and finds the site leveled. Cornelius and Thomas plan to go back to the landing site of the spaceship. As they are about to board a helicopter, the pilot attempts to shoot Thomas but gets shot instead before Thomas escapes alone on the helicopter. Some time later, Zira and Cornelius reach Thomas when he's back to his ship, where he has learnt that he has traveled in space for two thousand years and the spaceship can't take off. Zira tells him she has arranged for Nova to return to her own people. Thanking them for their concern, but refusing to heed their warnings that more apes will come for him, Thomas sets off on foot towards the jungle to join the wild humans.

Suddenly Zaius and a gorilla army catches up to Thomas, who runs briefly before stopping after seeing a gigantic object. Zira and Cornelius plead to Thomas to run, but he stands still and tearfully responds: "I'm afraid there's no place to run to. There's no place to go.", before Zaius' gorillas open fire and shoot him, either to death or to a pulp, either way leaving him there. Zira and Cornelius query why Thomas refused to flee, and as the apes leave the scene, the thing that Thomas saw and shattered him is revealed to be a destroyed Statue of Liberty, proof that the planet was a post-nuclear war Earth all along.

Reception

Geek.com praised the book, and so did the website FlickeringMyth.com.

References

2018 comics debuts
Boom! Studios titles
Planet of the Apes